"Our Don Bradman" is a 1930 song by Jack O'Hagan about the legendary Australian cricketer Donald Bradman. It was written just before the 1930 Ashes Test Series between England and Australia, which was held in England that year.

Content
The song celebrates Donald Bradman as someone who "has won Australia's very highest praise". It lists his achievements and talents, and declares him the person whom "all Australia raves about", more than "Amy Johnson or little Mickey Mouse". The song also mentions other contemporary Australian cricketers, namely Bill Woodfull, Clarrie Grimmett, Bill Ponsford, Alan Kippax "and the rest", but even though the singer acknowledges that they have "gallantly and nobly done their share" Bradman still "tops them all". The lines "How that Mister Lion, poor fish / must just sit and wish and wish / that our Don had never come across the foam" refer to the lion, one of the symbols of English cricket. The lyrics also mention the British cricketers Maurice Tate and Harold Larwood.

Public reception
The song was recorded with a vocal by Art Leonard and released in July 1930 by Regal. Some of O'Hagan's verses were omitted. On the B-side was another cricket song, "Our Eleven", written by Jack Lumsdaine. The sheet music was released at the same time, just as Bradman scored a triple-century in a Test match in England, and sold 40,000 copies in a few days. A piano roll was also released that month, recorded by Laurel Pardey.

The song quickly became popular and within a few weeks was being performed at community concerts around Australia. When Bradman returned to his home town of Bowral in November 1930 after the triumphant tour of England, the band at the civic reception played "Our Don Bradman".

The song was voted number one by teenage listeners of radio station 2UW in Sydney in 1967 after it was played as a joke for a listener who had sent it in.

Sources

1930 songs
Songs about Don Bradman
Songs about Australia
Cricket music
Cultural depictions of Don Bradman
Songs written by Jack O'Hagan